Merulempista colorata is a species of snout moth in the genus Merulempista. It was described by Wolfram Mey in 2011 and is known from Namibia.

References

Moths described in 2011
Phycitini